Man-Ape (M'Baku) is a supervillain appearing in American comic books published by Marvel Comics. Created by Roy Thomas and John Buscema, the character first appeared in The Avengers #62 (March 1969). Man-Ape is depicted as a frequent adversary of the superhero Black Panther.

Man-Ape has made scattered appearances on animated television series and video games while Winston Duke portrays a variation of the character in the Marvel Cinematic Universe films Black Panther (2018), Avengers: Infinity War (2018), Avengers: Endgame (2019), and Black Panther: Wakanda Forever (2022).

Publication history

Man-Ape first appeared in The Avengers #62 (March 1969). He was created by Roy Thomas and John Buscema.

Fictional character biography
M'Baku was born in Wakanda. He became one of Wakanda's greatest warriors, second only to the Black Panther. He plotted to usurp the throne of Wakanda with the help of the outlawed rival White Gorilla Cult and return Wakanda to a primitive state. M'Baku became a renegade and gains his powers by killing a white gorilla, bathing in its blood, and eating its flesh, taking the alias of Man-Ape. He fought with the Black Panther and was believed to be killed when the Panther Totem that he bound Black Panther to crumbled and buried him instead. He is revived by his aide N'Gamo and goes to America where the Black Panther is with the Avengers at the time.

He allies himself with the original Lethal Legion made up of Grim Reaper, Living Laser, Power Man, and Swordsman. He is the first member met by the Avengers. He attacks Captain America, but is beaten back by the rest of the Avengers. He then captures the Black Panther's girlfriend Monica Lynne, binding her hand and foot with metal clamps. The Black Panther is lured into a trap and knocked out by an exploding dummy of Monica. He is chained up and meets the other members. The Legion straps him and Monica to chairs before leaving, though he is able to escape and contact the other members, before the Grim Reaper defeats him. The Legion is defeated by the Avengers after Vision overcomes Power Man and frees the other members. Man-Ape bests Black Panther again until he is defeated by Captain America. Black Panther banishes Man-Ape from Wakanda on order of execution if he returns.

Man-Ape later joins a new Lethal Legion (consisting of the Grim Reaper, Black Talon, Goliath (Erik Josten's latest alias), Nekra, and Ultron-12) and battles Tigra, but abandons the Grim Reaper alongside Black Talon when the Reaper's racism became too much for him to tolerate.

Man-Ape travels to uninhabited parts of the world before joining Crimson Cowl's incarnation of the Masters of Evil which is defeated by the Thunderbolts.

Despite his rivalry with T'Challa, M'Baku was invited to the wedding of T'Challa and Ororo Munroe (also known as Storm of the X-Men), where he gets drunk on scotch and tries to pick a fight with Spider-Man.

Man-Ape is next seen at the end of Heroes for Hire #6, teamed with Grim Reaper & Saboteur.

Man-Ape is reportedly killed by Morlun while defending his people from Morlun's attack on the Man-Ape's kingdom. But before his apparent death, he sends an envoy to Wakanda to warn them of the approaching danger. Man-Ape later appears alive as a member of Purple Man's Villains for Hire.

Powers and abilities
The Man-Ape gained superhuman powers by consuming the flesh of a sacred white gorilla and bathing in white gorilla blood, enchanting him through the mystical transference of the abilities of the rare Wakandan white gorilla. M'Baku's mystically augmented powers include superhuman strength, speed, agility, stamina and durability equal to that of the mystical Wakandan white gorilla.

He has extensive formal military training in hand-to-hand combat from the Wakandan Royal Militia.

Reception

Accolades 
 In 2018, Comicbook.com ranked Man-Ape 3rd in their "8 Best Black Panther Villains" list and included him in their "7 Great Villains for Black Panther 2" list.
 In 2020, CBR.com ranked Man-Ape 2nd in their "Marvel: Ranking Black Panther's Rogues Gallery" list.
 In 2022, Screen Rant included Man-Ape in their "15 Most Powerful Black Panther Villains" list.
 In 2022, CBR.com ranked Man-Ape 3rd in their "10 Most Iconic Black Panther Villains" list.

Other versions

JLA/Avengers
In the 2003–2004 intercompany crossover JLA/Avengers, Man-Ape is among the mind-controlled villains who attack the heroes as they assault Krona's Stronghold and fights Big Barda.

Ultimate Marvel
In the Ultimate Marvel universe, M'Baku is the name of T'Challa's older brother. After the young T'Challa failed to complete the "Trial of the Black Panther", M'Baku derided him, saying that he should have taken the trial instead. Later, angry that his father had decided to share Wakanda’s technology in exchange for America’s help in saving T’Challa’s life, M'Baku left the kingdom.

In other media

Television
 Man-Ape appears in The Avengers: Earth's Mightiest Heroes, voiced by Kevin Michael Richardson. In the episode "Welcome to Wakanda", he challenges T'Chaka for Wakanda's throne and kills the king in combat with Klaw's unseen help. As Man-Ape takes the throne, T'Challa leaves to overthrow him. With Wakanda under their control, Man-Ape and Klaw have the Wakandans' mine for Vibranium. In the episode "Panther's Quest", Man-Ape speaks with the Grim Reaper about HYDRA's Vibranium purchases. However, T'Challa and Captain America confront Man-Ape. Despite using a sonic device to weaken him, T'Challa defeats Man-Ape and liberates Wakanda.
 M'Baku appears in Avengers Assemble, voiced by Ike Amadi. This version is a member of the Shadow Council who wears a gorilla-themed force-enhancer suit.

Film

 Winston Duke portrays M'Baku in films set in the Marvel Cinematic Universe. This version is the leader of the renegade Jabari Tribe, who shun Wakanda's technological society and have a religious reverence for gorillas, such as decorating their armor with white gorilla pelts and worshiping the gorilla god Hanuman as a part of complex Indo-African religion rather than the Panther god Bast. He is introduced in Black Panther, and makes subsequent appearances in Avengers: Infinity War, Avengers: Endgame, and Black Panther: Wakanda Forever.

Video games
 Man-Ape appears as a boss in the PS2, PSP, Nintendo DS, and Wii versions of Marvel: Ultimate Alliance 2, voiced by Emerson Franklin. In a fashion similar to his comic book origin, M'Baku leads an attack on Wakanda in a bid to usurp the throne from T'Challa whilst the country is incapacitated by a wave of hostile nanite machines created by the Fold.
 Man-Ape appears as a boss in Marvel: Avengers Alliance. This version is the leader of the White Gorillas.
 Man-Ape appears as a boss in Marvel Heroes.
 Man-Ape appears as a playable character in the "Black Panther" DLC for Lego Marvel's Avengers.
 Man-Ape appears as a playable character in Lego Marvel Super Heroes 2, voiced by Alexis Rodney.

References

External links
 Man-Ape at Marvel.com
 

Black people in comics
Characters created by John Buscema
Characters created by Roy Thomas
Comics characters introduced in 1969
Fictional African people
Fictional characters with superhuman durability or invulnerability
Fictional murderers
Fictional warlords
Gorilla characters in comics
Male characters in film
Marvel Comics characters with superhuman strength
Marvel Comics male supervillains
Wakandans